Bi Abr-e Choqamaran (also Romanized as Bī Abr-e Choqāmārān; also known as Bī Abr) is a village in Miyan Darband Rural District, in the Central District of Kermanshah County, Kermanshah Province, Iran. At the 2006 census, its population was 574, in 125 families.

References 

Populated places in Kermanshah County